Richard Glen Casada Jr. (born August 2, 1959) is an American politician, member of the  Republican Party in the Tennessee House of Representatives, where he represents District 63 (Williamson County). He was the Speaker of the Tennessee House of Representatives from January 8, 2019 through August 2, 2019, whereupon he resigned his post amid scandal. This was the shortest stint of a Tennessee Speaker of the House in modern history. Casada was previously the Majority Leader of the Tennessee House of Representatives. His opposition to Syrian refugees attracted national attention in the media in 2015.

He would later be implicated for having a role in using a firm known as Phoenix Solutions to launder money.

Early life
Glen Casada was born on August 2, 1959. He graduated from Western Kentucky University with a B.S. in Agriculture and Education in 1982.

Career
In 1994, Casada was elected to the County Commission of Williamson County.

In 2003, he was elected to the Tennessee House of Representatives.

In 2022, Casada decided not to seek reelection to the Tennessee House of Representatives, citing a desire for "a new chapter of public service." Casada instead ran for the Republican nomination for Williamson County Clerk, losing to incumbent county clerk Jeff Whidby by a margin of 4,218 to 12,860 votes.

Barack Obama Lawsuit
In 2009, Casada was one of the plaintiffs in a lawsuit in federal court, Captain Pamela Barnett v. Barack Hussein Obama, which claimed that Barack Obama was not an American citizen and therefore ineligible to be President of the United States. Judge David O. Carter ruled that Casada and other state legislators did not have standing to sue, since the supposed harm they feared was "highly speculative and conjectural."

Other Actions
In April 2011, Casada tried to repeal a workplace non-discrimination bill for sexual orientation and gender identity in Nashville. In an interview, he explained he was trying to "create a uniform environment across the state, similar to what the interstate commerce clause does for our country." The bill was supported by David Fowler's socially conservative Family Action Council of Tennessee, and the Log Cabin Republicans were opposed to it.

In November 2015, Casada said he wanted to stop admitting Syrian refugees in Tennessee. He also wanted to return those who were already in the state to the U.S. Immigration and Customs Enforcement.

In October 2016, Casada ran for re-election against Democratic candidate Courtenay Rogers. Casada won the election by more than 17,000 votes (a ratio of nearly 3 to 1). In February 2017, he was selected as the Republican Majority leader.

Casada voted for Ted Cruz in the Republican primary of the 2016 presidential election, and he voted for Donald Trump in the general election. On March 4, 2017, Casada was one of the main speakers at a rally in Legislative Plaza in Downtown Nashville to celebrate the policies of President Trump.

2019 Capitol Hill Scandals

Racial and Sexual text messages
In May 2019, several scandals broke out in the speaker's office from investigations that were conducted by WTVF, a local television station. First, it was uncovered that Casada's Chief of Staff, Cade Cothren, had possibly attempted to frame Justin Jones, a local civil rights activist, for violating a restraining order. This claim was later found to be false by a special prosecutor appointed to the case.

The text messages acquired showed Casada received one racially charged and several sexually explicit text messages from Cothren. One of the messages included Cothren who resigned his position on May 6.

Several lawmakers then encouraged Casada to resign as House Speaker as more information was revealed by the WTVF investigation. The other revelations were:

Other controversies 
 It was also uncovered that Casada hired Michael Lotfi, a political operative, on the House payroll, but did not have to report to work daily. He was only required to come "when needed." Lotfi was tasked with spinning a story to make Rep. David Byrd's sexual assault accusers look like they were fabricating their story.
 The FBI opened an investigation on the controversial vote on Educational Savings Accounts (School Vouchers).
 Members of the House of Representatives noticed there were additional "Research Analysts" hired, but they were assigned to be "hall monitors" and track certain members of the body. Shawn Hatmaker was confirmed to be one of the "hall monitors" and was relieved of his duties.

Resignation as House Speaker
On May 8, 2019, Casada apologized to his GOP colleagues and said that he would unify the House with an action plan. He then met with the Tennessee Black Caucus of State Legislators on May 20, 2019. Later that day, the TBCSL announced that they had lost confidence in his ability to lead and asked for his resignation.

The Tennessee House Republican caucus met to discuss their future with Casada as speaker. After a 3-hour meeting, the vote was 45–24 in favor of the No-Confidence resolution. After the resolution was adopted, Republican Governor Bill Lee announced that he would consider holding a special session of the legislature to hold a removal vote if he did not resign. On May 21, 2019, Casada announced that he will be resigning as Speaker of the House, but will remain in the chamber as a member.

Phoenix Solutions scandal
In January 2021, Casada was one of several current and former Tennessee legislators whose homes and offices were raided by the Federal Bureau of Investigation in relation to an investigation into the laundering of campaign funds. In March 2022, federal prosecutors alleged in court documents that Casada, his former chief of staff Cade Cothren and former Tennessee House member Robin Smith had prominent roles in setting up a shadowy Chattanooga-based public relations firm known as Phoenix Solutions. Phoenix Sollution LLC would be used to provide mail and consulting services for members of the Tennessee General Assembly and also served as a source for laundering illicit campaign money.

Participants in the scheme falsely claimed that the firm was operated by an experienced political consultant named “Matthew Phoenix,” who was a fictitious person. Several state lawmakers were alleged to have participated in the scheme, with Cothren engineering the kickbacks which were given to Casada, Smith and other Tennessee General Assembly members. Court documents suggested that both Casada and Cothren provided court testimony acknowledging the roles which Smith and other Tennessee General Assembly members had in the kickback scheme, though they were not named.

Casada was identified as a member of the Tennessee House who first elected in 2003 and served as Speaker of the Tennessee House from around January 2019 until around August 2019, when he resigned as Speaker after it was alleged he attempted to frame a local civil rights activist, and Cothren was identified as his Chief of Staff. Smith pled to a single count of honest service wire fraud, while also alleging that she and Casada pressured the House Republican Caucus and lawmakers to do business with Phoenix Solutions, including work on taxpayer-funded mailers.

Personal life
Casada is divorced, and has four children and six grandchildren. He attends the Brentwood Baptist Church.

References

|-

1959 births
21st-century American politicians
Baptists from Tennessee
Living people
People from Williamson County, Tennessee
Speakers of the Tennessee House of Representatives
Republican Party members of the Tennessee House of Representatives
Western Kentucky University alumni